The Rahway River drainage basin encompasses approximately 41 square miles in Union, Essex, and Middlesex counties in the northeastern part of the U.S. state of New Jersey.

The Rahway River consists of four separate branches that converge in Rahway, from whence it flows as a single waterway to its mouth at the Arthur Kill. The longest, or West Branch, courses for 24 miles from Verona. The East Branch rises in West Orange/Montclair and joins the West Branch in Springfield, forming the main stem of the river. The South Branch, which originates in Woodbridge, and the Robinson's Branch, which begins in Scotch Plains, join the main stem in Rahway. The  upper  portion above Rahway consists of floodplains, woodlands and freshwater marshes; the lower portion includes saltwater marshes and tidal flats. The river is tidal for approximately five mies upstream.

Many of the crossings of the river were built in the late 19th and early 20th century and are part of the Rahway River Parkway, a greenway along the banks of the river.

Crossings (main stem)

Crossings West Branch

See also
List of crossings of the Elizabeth River
List of county routes in Union County, New Jersey
List of county routes in Essex County, New Jersey
List of county routes in Middlesex County, New Jersey
List of bridges documented by the Historic American Engineering Record in New Jersey
List of crossings of the Raritan River

References

External links

Bridges in New Jersey
Bridges in Union County, New Jersey
Bridges in Essex County, New Jersey
Rahway River
Rahway River